Mordellistena y-nigrum is a species of beetle in the family Mordellidae. It was described in 1937 by Eugene Ray from Puerto Rico. It is named for its diagnostic characteristic, a Y-shaped black spot on the region of the elytra surrounding the scutellum.

This beetle measures  in length, or  when including the anal stylus.

References

y-nigrum
Beetles of North America
Insects of Puerto Rico
Endemic fauna of Puerto Rico
Beetles described in 1937